Rubaga Division, also Lubaga Division, is one of the divisions that makes up the city of Kampala, Uganda. The division takes its name from Rubaga, where the division headquarters are located.

Location

Rubaga Division lies in the western part of the city, bordering Wakiso District to the west and south of the division. The eastern boundary of the division is Kampala Central Division. Kawempe Division lies to the north of Rubaga Division. The coordinates of the division are 00 18N, 32 33E (Latitude:0.3029; Longitude:32.5529). Neighbourhoods in the division include Mutundwe, Nateete, Ndeeba, Kabowa, Najjanankumbi, Lungujja, Busega, Lubaga, Mengo, Namungoona, Lubya, Lugala, Bukesa, Namirembe, Naakulabye, Kasubi, and Kawaala.

Points of interest
The following points of interest are located in Rubaga Division:
 Saint Mary's Cathedral Rubaga
 Residence of the Cardinal of Kampala
 Residence of the Archbishop of Kampala Archdiocese
 Lubaga Hospital - A 274-bed community hospital owned by the Catholic Archdiocese of Kampala
 Lubaga Nurses School
 Rubaga Miracle Center - A Pentecostal Congregation Church
 Pope Paul VI Memorial Community Center
 Headquarters of Rubaga Division
 Mengo Palace - The Lubiri is located in Rubaga Division
 Bulange - Houses the Buganda Parliament and offices of the Kabaka of Buganda

See also
Divisions of Kampala
Lubaga
Mengo, Uganda
Nakasero

References

External links
 Google Map of the Rubaga Division of Kampala

Geography of Kampala
Populated places in Uganda